Cumilla United is a Bangladeshi Women's association football club based on Cumilla. The club competes in the Bangladesh Women's Football League, the top division of women's football in Bangladesh.

History

Current squad

The following squad were named for 2021–22 BWFL season.

Every player in this club are from its own Academy.

Competitive record

Club management

Current technical staff
As of December 2020

Team record

Head coach record

References

2020 establishments in Bangladesh
Women's football clubs in Bangladesh
Sport in Comilla
Organisations based in Comilla